Giuseppe Ceppetelli (15 March 1846 – 12 March 1917) was an Italian Roman Catholic archbishop. At the time of his death, he was the Titular Patriarch of Constantinople. He was ordained on Holy Saturday of 1870 and was consecrated by the Vicar General of Rome, Raffaele Monaco La Valletta, in 1882. He ordained the 22-year-old Angelo Giuseppe Roncalli, the future Pope John XXIII, to the priesthood on 10 August 1904.

He died on the eve of his 71st birthday in 1917 and was buried in Rome.

References

External links and additional sources
 (for Chronology of Bishops) 
 (for Chronology of Bishops)  

1846 births
1917 deaths
20th-century Italian cardinals
19th-century Italian Roman Catholic bishops
20th-century Italian Roman Catholic titular archbishops
Latin Patriarchs of Constantinople